LST may refer to:

Education 
 Licentiate of Sacred Theology
 Liston College
 London School of Theology

Organizations 
 Law School Transparency
 Linux Support Team, a defunct German Linux distributor (LST Linux, Power Linux) since 1993
 LST Software GmbH (from Linux System Technology), a German software company, successor of Linux Support Team and predecessor of Caldera Deutschland GmbH

Places 
 Launceston Airport
 Liverpool Street station, a major railway and tube station in London (station code LST)

Science and technology 
 Land Surveyor in Training
 Landing Ship, Tank, a type of United States Navy amphibious warfare ship
 Laplace-Stieltjes transform, a transform similar to the Laplace transform
 Large Space Telescope, the Hubble Space Telescope
 Living Systems Theory
 Log-space transducer, a type of Turing machine used for log-space reductions 
 Löwenheim–Skolem theorem, a theorem in first-order logic dealing with the cardinality of models
 Lowstand systems tract, a systems tract in sequence stratigraphy
 LST:, a built-in device driver name in 86-DOS and some versions of MS-DOS 1.25
 Lyddane–Sachs–Teller relation for optical phonons in solids or the related relation for hydrodynamics

Time 
 Least slack time scheduling
 Local Sidereal Time
 Local Standard Time

Other
L.S.T. (album)

See also

 
 list (disambiguation)
 LSST (disambiguation)